The Blue and the Gray or variant may refer to:

Geography
Blue & Grey District, a Scouting district in Pennsylvania
 Blue and Gray Museum (Georgia), in Fitzgerald, Georgia
 Blue and Gray Museum (Alabama), in Decatur, Alabama

Military and school colors
American Civil War, the two sides being Union U.S.A. blue and Confederate rebel gray 
 29th Infantry Division (United States), the "Blue and Gray"
Blue and Gray (Georgetown), the school colors of Georgetown University

Entertainment
The Blue and the Gray (miniseries)
"The Blue and the Gray" (song), a song composed by Paul Dresser
"The Blue and the Gray" (The Simpsons), television episode
"The Blue and the Grey" (Wild Kratts), television episode
Blue & Gray, 2003 album by The United States Coast Guard Band
Blue and Gray (board game), an abstract strategy board game
Blue and Gray (album), a 1981 country rock album by Poco
"Blue & Grey" (song), a song by BTS from Be
Blue & Gray: Four American Civil War Battles, a 1975 wargame by Simulations Publications Inc. (SPI)
Blue & Gray II, a 1975 wargame by Simulations Publications Inc. (SPI)

Blue-gray color
 Blue-gray, a color
 RAL 7031 Blue grey, a RAL color
 Blue Grey cattle, a breed of beef cattle
 Bluegray mbuna (Melanochromis johannii), a fish
 Bluegrey carpetshark (Brachaelurus colcloughi), a shark
 Blue-gray mouse (Pseudomys glaucus), an extinct mouse
 Blue-grey tanager (Thraupis episcopus), a songbird
 Blue-grey gnatcatcher (Polioptila caerulea), a songbird
 Blue-grey noddy (Procelsterna cerulea), a tern (bird)
 Blue Grey River, a river in New Zealand
 Project A-ko: Grey Side/Blue Side, cartoon anime OVA
 Blue–Gray Football Classic, U.S. college American football all-star game
 Bluefield Blue-Grays, baseball team

See also
 Blue (disambiguation)
 Gray (disambiguation)
 Blue and Gray Museum (disambiguation)